Millette may refer to:

People with the surname 
 Charles Hus, dit Millet (1738–1802), political figure in Lower Canada 
 Charlotte Robillard-Millette (born 1999), Canadian professional tennis player
 Jacynthe Millette-Bilodeau (born 1979), Canadian pop singer
 Jean-Louis Millette (1935–1999), French-speaking actor and screenwriter
 Joe Millette (born 1965), former shortstop in Major League Baseball
 Leroy F. Millette, Jr. (born 1949), justice of the Supreme Court of Virginia
 Maya Millete (born 1981), American woman who went missing in 2021
 Robert E. Millette, Ambassador of Grenada to the United Nations from 1995 to 1998
 Robert Millette (born 1961), former player and coach of ice hockey for Diables Noirs de Tours

Other uses
 Millette Alexander (born 1933), American concert actress and pianist
 Millette River, a tributary of the Saint Lawrence River in Trois-Rivières, Mauricie, Quebec, Canada

See also
 Millet